Te Kauwhata is a small town in the north of the Waikato region of New Zealand, situated  close to the western shore of Lake Waikare, some 40 km north of Hamilton and approximately 58 km south of Manukau City.

Description
Te Kauwhata may translate as "the empty storehouse", possibly referring to food storehouses in the original ancient Māori settlement. Te Kauwhata can also translate as "the spiritual medium" or "the frame".

The original name of the research farm and railway station was Wairangi, changed to Waerenga in 1897. Waerenga means a bush clearing for farming. The name Te Kauwhata was used for the settlement from 1910, Te Kauwhata was surveyed for a township in 1912.

Te Kauwhata is the site of a range of farms, including dairy and dry stock, as well as extensive horticulture. Of note is that Te Kauwhata, or "TK" as the locals say, is bordered by the Whangamarino Swamp.

Demographics

At the 2018 New Zealand census, Te Kauwhata had smaller boundaries, covering . It had a population of 1,617  an increase of 483 people (42.6%) since the 2013 census, and an increase of 711 people (78.5%) since the 2006 census. There were 603 households, comprising 780 males and 840 females, giving a sex ratio of 0.93 males per female. The median age was 40.2 years (compared with 37.4 years nationally), with 354 people (21.9%) aged under 15 years, 237 (14.7%) aged 15 to 29, 627 (38.8%) aged 30 to 64, and 399 (24.7%) aged 65 or older.

Ethnicities were 77.9% European/Pākehā, 23.0% Māori, 3.3% Pacific peoples, 7.6% Asian, and 1.9% other ethnicities. People may identify with more than one ethnicity.

The percentage of people born overseas was 21.0, compared with 27.1% nationally.

Although some people chose not to answer the census's question about religious affiliation, 52.1% had no religion, 34.0% were Christian, 1.5% had Māori religious beliefs, 0.7% were Hindu, 0.6% were Muslim, 0.9% were Buddhist and 2.6% had other religions.

Of those at least 15 years old, 171 (13.5%) people had a bachelor's or higher degree, and 315 (24.9%) people had no formal qualifications. The median income was $26,800, compared with $31,800 nationally. 207 people (16.4%) earned over $70,000 compared to 17.2% nationally. The employment status of those at least 15 was that 567 (44.9%) people were employed full-time, 144 (11.4%) were part-time, and 33 (2.6%) were unemployed.

Viticulture 

Te Kauwhata lies at the centre of one of New Zealand's smaller wine-producing regions, which stretches from Pukekohe, just south of Auckland, across to Thames and Paeroa at the foot of the Coromandel Peninsula. The region is particularly notable for its Cabernet Sauvignon, Chardonnay and Sauvignon blanc wines.

A government research station was set up in 1886 to explore different crop options. Romeo Bragato took over the running of this station in 1901, with the first wine produced there in 1903. The research station was in private hands, as part of Rongopai wines, and has been subsequently bought out by Babich Wines, but the original buildings are still in use as a cellar door. In February 2016, Invivo Wines, producer of Graham Norton's Own Sauvignon Blanc, announced it had secure a 10-year lease of this winery.

Marae

The local Waikare Marae and Ngāti Hine meeting house is a traditional meeting ground for the Waikato Tainui hapū of Ngāti Hine, Ngāti Naho, Ngāti Pou and Ngāti Taratikitiki.

Education 

The town also has three early childhood education centres.

Transport
Between 1877 and 1995, the Te Kauwhata railway station was served by trains running on the North Island Main Trunk. A new service branded Te Huia and connecting Auckland and Hamilton will commence in August 2020. At a later stage, it will be considered to reactivate the Te Kauwhata railway station.

References

External links

Waikato District
Populated places in Waikato
Wine regions of New Zealand
Populated lakeshore places in New Zealand